Janam is a 1993 Indian Malayalam film, directed by Viji Thampi and starring Murali, Siddique and Geetha in lead roles.

Cast
 Murali as Balachandran
 Siddique as Sivan
 Geetha as Susheela 
 Jagadish as Harikrishnan 
 Thilakan as D.G.P Thomas Mathew
 Sukumaran as Luckose
 Rajan P. Dev as Dasappan
 Rekha as Gomathiyamma
 Jagathy Sreekumar as Vazhuthala Sasi 
 Janardhanan as K. Divakaran 
 K. B. Ganesh Kumar as Mahesh
 K. P. A. C. Lalitha as Devaki 
 Jose Pellissery as Nair
 Karamana Janardanan Nair as Ananthan 
 Narendra Prasad as Azheekkal Raghavan
 Mamukkoya as Janab Koyakkutty Sahib
 K. P. A. C. Azeez as I.G Madhavan Nair
 Kollam Thulasi as Mathachan 
 Jagannatha Varma as City Police Commissioner Fernandez
 Indrans as Sasi's Assistant
 Bheeman Raghu as Firoz
 Kamal Gaur as Khalid Settu
 Seetha as Sreedevi
 Malavika as Reshma
 Manakkadu Ravi as Latheef
 Kaladi Omana as Lakshmiyamma
 Manu Varma as Ramesh Venu 
 James as Shaji
 Kukku Parameshwaran as Anjana
 Aliyar as Party Leader

References

External links
 

1993 films
1990s Malayalam-language films
Films directed by Viji Thampi